Eastern Min or Min Dong (Foochow Romanized: Mìng-dĕ̤ng-ngṳ̄), is a branch of the Min group of the Sinitic languages of China. The prestige form and most commonly cited representative form is the Fuzhou dialect, the speech of the capital of Fujian.

Geographic distribution

Fujian and vicinity

Eastern Min varieties are mainly spoken in the eastern part of Fujian Province (闽东) of the People's Republic of China, in and near the cities of Fuzhou and Ningde. They are also widely encountered as the mother tongue on the Matsu Islands controlled by the Republic of China. Additionally, the inhabitants of Taishun and Cangnan to the north of Fujian in Zhejiang also speak Eastern Min varieties. Eastern Min generally coexists with the official language, Standard Chinese, in all these areas.

United States
As the coastal area of Fujian has been the historical homeland of a large worldwide diaspora of overseas Chinese, varieties of Eastern Min can also be found across the world, especially in their respective Chinatowns. Cities with high concentrations of such immigrants include New York City, especially Little Fuzhou, Manhattan, Sunset Park, Brooklyn and Flushing, Queens.

Europe

They are also found in various Chinatown communities in Europe, including London, Paris and Prato in Italy.

Japan and Malaysia

Chinese communities within Ikebukuro, Tokyo as well as Sibu, Sarawak, Malaysia have significant populations of Eastern Min speakers. Fuzhou communities can also be found in Sitiawan, Perak and Yong Peng, Johor in West Malaysia.

Classification

Eastern Min is descended from Proto-Min, which split from the transition from Old Chinese into Middle Chinese during the Han Dynasty. It has been classified by Pan Maoding and Jerry Norman as belonging to the Coastal Min branch, and is thus closely related to Northern Min.

Norman lists four distinctive features in the development of Eastern Min:

 The Proto-Min initial *dz- becomes s- in Eastern Min, as opposed to ts- as in Southern Min. For example,  "to sit" is pronounced sô̤i in colloquial Fuzhou dialect, but tsō in Xiamen and Taiwanese Hokkien.

 Eastern Min varieties have an upper register tone for words which correspond to voiceless nasal initials in Proto-Min, e.g.  "younger sister" in Fuzhou is pronounced with an upper departing tone muói rather than a lower departing tone.

 There are some lexemes that descend from Old Chinese which have been conserved in Eastern Min but replaced in other Min varieties.

 A lack of nasal vowels, in contrast to Southern Min.

Branches

Eastern Min is conventionally divided into three branches:
 Houguan dialect group, also called the Southern subgroup, including the Fuzhou dialect, Fuqing dialect, Changle dialect, Lianjiang dialect and the dialect of the Matsu Islands.
 Funing dialect group, also called the Northern subgroup, including the Ningde dialect and the Fu'an dialect.
 Manjiang dialect, spoken in parts of Taishun and Cangnan, Wenzhou, Zhejiang.

Besides these three branches, some dialect islands in the southern Chinese province of Guangdong have been classified as Eastern Min. 
Zhongshan Min is a group of Min varieties spoken in the Zhongshan county of Guangdong, divided into three branches: the Longdu dialect and Nanlang dialect belong to the Eastern Min group, while the Sanxiang dialect belongs to Southern Min.

Phonology

The Eastern Min group has a phonology which is particularly divergent from other varieties of Chinese. The Manjiang dialect on the other hand has been influenced by the Wu dialects of Zhejiang, and hence has significantly more initials than the varieties of Fujian.

The finals vary significantly between varieties, with the extremes being represented by Manjiang dialects at a low of 39 separate finals, and the Ningde dialect representing the high at 69 finals.

Eastern Min varieties generally have seven tones, by the traditional count (based on the four tones of Middle Chinese, including the entering tone as a separate entity). In the middle of the Qing dynasty, eight tones were attested, but the historical rising tones re-merged.

Sandhi phenomena

The Eastern Min varieties have a wide of range of sandhi phenomena. As well as tone sandhi, common to many varieties of Chinese, there is also the assimilation of consonants and vowel alternations (such as rime tensing).

Tone sandhi across Eastern Min varieties can be regressive (where the last syllable affects the pronunciation of those before), progressive (where earlier syllables affect the later ones) or mutual (where both or all syllables change). The rules are generally quite complicated.

Initial assimilation of consonants is usually progressive, and may create new phonemes that are not phonemically contrastive in initial position but do contrast in medial position. A few varieties exhibit regressive assimilation too.

See also
 Protection of the varieties of Chinese

References

Further reading

 
 
 Akitani Hiroyuki; Chen Zeping [秋谷裕幸; 陈泽平]. 2012. The Gutian dialect of Min Dong District [闽东区古田方言研究]. Fuzhou: Fujian People's Press [福建人民出版社]. 

 
Languages of China
Languages of Taiwan
Languages of Hong Kong
Languages of Malaysia
Chinese languages in Singapore
Languages of Singapore
Languages of Brunei
Languages of the United States
Languages of Canada
Languages of Japan